The Vega Model 2 Starliner was a prototype five-seat feeder airliner produced by the Vega Airplane Company, a subsidiary of Lockheed. It was designed to be powered by an unusual powerplant, consisting of two Menasco piston engines coupled together to drive a single propeller. A single example was built, flying in 1939, but no production followed.

Design and development
In 1935 Lockheed chief engineer Hall Hibbard discussed with Al Menasco the coupling of two Menasco C6S-4 engines mounted side-by side, driving a single propeller. In 1937, a Lockheed subsidiary, the AiRover Company, designed the Model 2 Starliner, to be powered by the new  Menasco U2-544 Unitwin engine. The Starliner was a low-wing monoplane constructed with a light-alloy semi-monocoque structure conventional tail and rearward retracting undercarriage which remained exposed when retracted. The enclosed cabin was available in two cabin layouts: a custom luxury setup for private owners or a "Starliner" five seat configuration with a smaller baggage compartment for airline use. The twin engine design was intended to provide a margin of safety in the event of a failure of one engine half, with the airplane continuing to fly on the other engine half.

The AiRover Company undertook to build the Starliner and was re-organised as the Vega Airplane Company in 1938, with Jack Wassall as project engineer. The sole Starliner emerged in early 1939 and was marketed as a small feeder-liner and custom executive transport. The first flight from Burbank on 22 April 1939 ended with an emergency landing, after the propeller slipped into fine-pitch. During the repairs the single tail unit was replaced with a Lockheed trademark twin tail.

Found to be too small for airline use, the Starliner was discontinued with the need for Lockheed and Vega to concentrate on military contracts, but the Starliner name would later be reused on the Lockheed L-1649 Starliner.

Operational history
The prototype was first flown by Harry Downs at Plant B-1 in Burbank, California on 22 April 1939, making an emergency landing when the propeller entered fine-pitch. Flight testing continued after repairs, but another forced-landing occurred after the undercarriage failed to extend. Repaired again, the Starliner completed its flight test program, flying a total of 85 hours before the aircraft was sold to a movie studio for use as a non-flying prop.

Variants
Model 2
Single tail version
Model 22
Twin tail version
Model 24
Cargo version

Operators

 Mid-Continent Airlines (proposed)
 Vega Aircraft Corporation

Specifications

See also

References

1930s United States civil utility aircraft
Single-engined tractor aircraft
Low-wing aircraft
Aircraft first flown in 1939